Naděžda Plíšková (6 November 1934 Rozdělov u Kladna - 16 September 1999 Prague) was a Czech printmaker, painter, ceramist, author of sculptural objects and poet.

Life 
Naděžda Plíšková studied graphic art at the Higher School of Arts and Crafts in Prague (1950-1954, prof. Jaroslav Vodrážka) and in 1954-1958 she studied graphic art at the Academy of Fine Arts in Prague (prof. Vladimír Silovský). In 1958-1959 she took a scholarship at the Hochschule für Grafik und Buchkunst Leipzig (prof. Gerhard Kurt Miller), which she completed with a series of woodcuts for books by Karel Čapek. She was then accepted to study painting in the studio of Prof. Karel Souček at the Academy of Fine Arts in Prague, where she spent two more honorary years after graduation (1961) and passed the state exam (Prof. Jiří Kotalík).

In addition to printmaking, she worked on ceramics, wrote poetry and socialised with artists and theoreticians from the Křižovnická School. In 1964 she married the sculptor and printmaker Karel Nepraš. Their daughter Karolína Neprašová-Kračková is also an artist. 

In 1968-1969 she completed a scholarship in Stuttgart and had an exhibition there with Jiří Balcar. Plíšková has returned to Czechoslovakia occupied by the Warsaw Pact troops. She was offered another scholarship by the Ford Foundation in November 1969, but was not allowed to go to the United States. After the birth of her daughter (1975) and with limited opportunity to exhibit, she devoted herself mainly to ex libris and writing poetry for samizdat editions. During normalization she had only a few exhibitions in small unofficial galleries.

In 1982 she suffered a serious spinal cord injury, underwent surgery and a long convalescence. After returning from the hospital, in the suffocating atmosphere of the Husák normalization, she almost resigned to her own work. In 1983, she wrote to Jindřich Chalupecký: "If you only knew how hard it is to get used to the fact that nobody counts on you anymore, and to watch averages, diligent averages, exhibiting, scheming and going merrily on".

Plíšková has been a member of Association of Czech Graphic Artists Hollar since 1969. After the fall of the communist regime in 1989, she was a founding member of the free association Tolerance, but her artistic and literary work is clearly marked by her unhappy personal fate until the late 1990s. She died in Prague on 16 September 1999.

Work

Literary work and illustrations 
She published her poems and prose from the late 1950s and then especially in the 1970s in samizdat publications - Czech Expedition, Spektrum, Vokno, Revolver Revue, Lidové noviny, etc. The poetry collection Thirteen Poems (1982) was also published in samizdat. She is listed in the Toronto Dictionary of Czech Writers (1982).

Some of these texts are included in the collection Plíšková by alphabet (1991). Poems and prose stylized as overheard monologues and restaurant speeches make up the book Pub Romanticism (1998). The poems collected in the volume Plíšková to Herself (2000) are mostly reflections on personal relationships, from motherhood and friends' parties to an increasingly strong perception of the loss of love, cruel loneliness, and reflections on the end of life. The posthumously published book contains works from 1997-1999, some texts not included in other publications and, in the editorial notes, a transcription of letters to Jindřich Chalupecký.

A commentary on some of the author's life milestones is her interview with Andrej Stankovič in Revolver Revue No. 47 of 2001, which was published posthumously at her request.

Quote 
Naděžda Plíšková: S U N should shine more at night, there is enough light in the day-time anyway

Bibliography 
 Naděžda Plíšková: Plíšková by alphabet, Prologue by Jan Lopatka, Edition of Writing Artists, vol. 1, 121 p., Dandy Club, Prague 1991, ISBN 80-900352-4-8
 Naděžda Plíšková, Pub Romanticism, New Line Edition, vol. 21, 83 p., Petrov, Brno 1998, ISBN 80-7227-034-6
 Naděžda Plíšková: Plíšková to herself, Poetry edition, vol. 46, 253 p., Torst, Prague 2000, ISBN 80-7215-114-2

Illustrations 
 Klement Bochořák, Poems for big children, drawing on the cover, frontispiece by Naděžda Plíšková, Edition Czech Poems, vol. 233, Prague 1964
 Michal Černík, A Life Deciphered, illustration: Naděžda Plíšková, Edition Czech Poems, Prague 1987
 Petr Kovařík, Don't talk to me when I shave, illustration: Naděžda Plíšková, Mladá fronta, Prague 1990. ISBN 80-204-0168-7

Prints and drawings 
Naděžda Plíšková already attracted attention with her bravura drawings and graphic sheets at group exhibitions of young artists in the early 1960s. Her work is still relevant today, although the subjects of her best-known works reflect the state of society before 1970. They show her penetrating intelligence, her lively sense of humour and sharp irony, as well as expressing the absurdity of specific life situations.

In her first drawings, she still refers to informel and the legacy of surrealism (Couple, 1963, The Jealous Beetle, 1966), but gradually concentrates on ironic reflection on contemporary themes (On the Subject of Caesar's Thumb, 1970). Her work from the 1960s was permeated by the invention, hope and perhaps even naivety of a decade that has fundamentally influenced everything that has happened in art since.

Naďa Plíšková could probably be described as a successor to the Dadaists. Her graphic works have their own order, which is, however, prompted by the strange rules governing an absurd world where everything is turned upside down (Me, 1970). With her artistic virtuosity, she was able to elevate even banal subjects to a work of art and at the same time relativize the work itself by challenging its destruction (Little Erotic Box, 1973). She had an amazing imagination, with which she was able to react with light exaggeration to the unquestionable values of the past (Mona Lisa, 1968; The Memory of Botticelli, 1968; Hieronymus Bosch's Dice, 1973) and to relativise everyday situations (Triptych, 1967). Plíšková reflected her position as a woman in the predominantly patriarchal society of banned artists and the underground in an original way, e.g. with sarcastic designs from the 1990s for her monument, or a graphic commentary on the promoted ideal of the perfect young female body (Re-stiching, 1968). 

The mundane situations she observed and explored with analytical detachment may be reminiscent of Western European or American pop art (Ideal Sauce, 1968; Study for a Painting, 1968), with which she has been compared by most Czech and foreign critics. Plíšková created a distinctive variety of pop-art without sticking to any paradigm. However, she created its distinctive "European chamber equivalent", without adhering to any models. Had she lived in the Western world, she would probably have naturally aligned herself with artists who responded to the consumer lifestyle with a sharp criticality and at the same time with a distinct sense of expressing the absurd. However, she managed to do the same at least within the local art scene, where she could draw on an environment that was conducive to a distinctive form of Czech Dadaism Czech Dadaism (4 servings of tripe soup across the street, 1969; Proposal for a monument to Karel Nepraš, 1979)

Rather than consumerism, Plíšková thematized Czech beer culture (10 Gentlemen and 1 Lady, 1971) and portrayed symbols of socialist everyday life, marked by limited supply. She also ironized the proclaimed social security and a certain standard of living offered to citizens by the normalization regime in exchange for their resignation to dealing with public affairs (Knedlík základ rodiny / Dumpling the basis of the family, 1982). According to Petr Rezek, Plíšková's work cannot be placed in the context of Pop Art, because its level of criticality and irony contradicts this classification.

Naďa Plíšková worked in printmaking using traditional technical means (mostly drypoint and etching), but with an unconventional vision of reality. Jindřich Chalupecký describes her perception of reality as lyrical sarcasm. "Behind the sarcasm of her prints, all the more cruel because it is uttered with the impersonality of an objective protocol, there is a sensibility facing the barren banality of life." Plíšková exchanged letters with Chalupecký, but she did not accept his sometimes almost mentoring attitude towards her own work or his interpretation of Marcel Duchamp's work as an androgynous artist. In her graphic sheet, for example, she ironized Duchamp's ready-made "Fountain" as Hommage á Karel Nepraš (1989).

The same feeling of life is reflected in the objects in which she looks with detachment both at herself and at everything that was happening around her and that she had to cope with. At the time of the deepest social marasmus at the beginning of the 1980s, she created works full of bitter humour (Quadrangular Wheel, 1980; Beer Case, 1981), but by the early 1990s her work touches more and more on personal themes, and bitterness and loss of hope join the exaggeration in her texts and artworks (drawing At the Bottom, 1990; Monument for My Man, 1992; My Monument, 1997).

School drawings and early works

Representation in collections 
 Library of Congress, Washington D.C.
 Musée de l'art contemporaine, Paris
 Musée de la Ville de Paris
 Museo de Bellas Artes de Bilbao
 Museum Essen
 Kunsthalle, Darmstadt
 Owens Art Gallery Sackville, New Brunswick
 National Gallery in Prague
 Slovak National Gallery
 Aleš South Bohemian Gallery in Hluboká nad Vltavou
 Czech Museum of Fine Arts, Prague
 Prague City Gallery
 Gallery of Modern Art in Roudnice nad Labem
 North Bohemian Gallery of Fine Arts in Litoměřice
 Regional Gallery in Liberec
 Gallery of Fine Arts in Ostrava
 Art Gallery Karlovy Vary
 Gallery of Fine Arts in Havlíčkův Brod
 Gallery of Modern Art in Hradec Králové
 Regional Gallery of the Highlands in Jihlava
 Gallery of Fine Arts in Hodonin
 Museum of Art and Design Benešov
 Private collections at home and abroad

Exhibitions

Author´s 
 1967 Gallery of Youth, Mánes, Prague
 1968 Nadezda Pliskova & Jiri Balcar: Grafik, Galerie am Berg, Stuttgart
 1968 Graphics, Small Gallery of the Czechoslovak Writer, Brno
 1970 Graphics, sculptures 1968-1970, Václav Špála Gallery, Prague
 1978 Drawings, graphics, Cabinet of Graphic Arts, Olomouc
 1982 Drawings and graphics, Exhibition Centre Černá Louka, Ostrava
 1993 Revalvace, graphics, drawings, objects, Hollar Gallery, Prague
 1997 Prints, drawings, Regional Gallery, Liberec
 2000 Silence must be cultivated, Montmartre Gallery, Prague, Gambit Gallery, Prague
 2013 Prints, objects, Hollar, Prague

Collective exhibitions abroad (selection) 
 1965	Keramik aus 12 ländern, Internationaler Künstlerclub IKC (Palais Pálffy), Vienna
 1966	Junge tschechische Grafik, Heidelberg
 1967	Tschechische Kunst, Göhrde
 1967 	17 tsjechische kunstenaars , Galerie Orez, The Hague
 1968	Kunstamt Wilmersdorf, Berlín
 1968 	Sex Från Prag, Konstforum, Norrköping, Stenhusgården, Linköping
 1968	VI. Internationale ausstellung Graphik, Europahaus Wien
 1969	Zestien Tsjechische kunstenaars: Dertien grafici en drie keramisten, Amsterdam
 1969	Junge Künstler aus der ČSSR, Berlin
 1969 	6 Graveurs de Prague, Galerie La Hune, Paris
 1969 	Salon de Mai, Sales d´Exposition Wilson, Paris
 1969–1970 Recent Graphics from Prague, 12th Floor Gallery, Los Angeles
 1970  Graveurs tchécoslovaques contemporains, Cabinet d'arts graphiques, Genéve
 1971  45 zeitgenössische künstler aus der Tschechoslowakei: Malerei, Plastik, Grafik, Glasobjekte, Baukunst, Cologne
 1971	Werken van Tsjechoslowaakse Grafici 1960-1970, Utrecht
 1973 	Art tchèque contemporain. Fribourg
 1978	Christchurch Art Festival, Robert McDougall Art Gallery, Christchurch
 1980	Die Kunst Osteuropas im 20. Jahrhundert, Garmisch-Partenkirchen
 1990	Image Imprimée de Tchécoslovaquie. Affiche, gravure, illustration, La Louviere
 1995	Grafik tschechischer Künstler, Bad Steben
 2005 	Strength and Will: Czech Prints from behind the Iron Curtain, Anne and Jacques Baruch Collection, Cincinnati Art Museum, Cincinnati
 2005 Œuvres graphiques des années 60, Centre tchèque Paris

References

Notes

Sources

Monography 
 I, Naděžda Plíšková, text by Mariana Placáková, Museum Kampa - Jan and Meda Mládek Foundation, Prague 2019, ISBN 978-80-87344-49-1

Author catalogues (selection) 
 Naděžda Plíšková : graphic art, text by Oleg Sus, Ludmila Vachtová, Čs. spisovatel, Brno 1968
 Naděžda Plíšková, text by Ivan Jirous, Art Centrum, Prague 1969
 Naděžda Plíšková : prints, sculptures, drawings, introduction by Ivan Jirous, Gallery of Fine Arts, Havlíčkův Brod 1970
 Naděžda Plíšková : prints - sculptures 1968-1970, text by Ivan Jirous., Union of Czechoslovak Visual Artists, Prague 1970
 Naděžda Plíšková : drawings and prints, text by František Dvořák, photographs by Ivan Wurm, Jiří Hampl and the photographic workshop of the National Gallery, in: Regional Gallery of Fine Arts, Olomouc 1978
 Naděžda Plíšková : prints - drawings - ex libris, text by František Šmejkal. Prague: Czech Fine Arts Fund, 1981
 Naděžda Plíšková : drawings and prints, text by Jindřich Chalupecký, František Dvořák, František Šmejkal, Milan Weber, Ostrava 1982
 Naděžda Plíšková : revalvace : prints, drawings, objects, Hollar Gallery, Prague 1993
 Naděžda Plíšková : prints and objects, text by Naďa Řeháková, Regional Gallery in Liberec 1997

General monographs 
 Luboš Hlaváček, Contemporary graphics (II), Odeon, Prague 1978, pp. 68-69.
 Genevieve Bénamou, L'art aujourd'hui en Tchécoslovaquie, 190 p., Genevieve Bénamou (ed.), Goussainville 1979
 František Dvořák, Contemporary ex-libris, Odeon, Prague 1979, pp. 62-63.
 Jindřich Marco, About graphic art : a book for collectors and art lovers, Mladá fronta, Prague 1981, pp. 107, 137, 335.
 Jindřich Chalupecký, New Art in Bohemia, Edition Ars pictura, vol. 1., 173 p., H&H, Jinočany 1994, ISBN 80-85787-81-4.
 Jiří Bouda et al., Czech Graphic Art of the 20th Century, introduction by Jiří Machalický, reprofoto by Roman Maleček, 325 p., Association of Czech Graphic Artists Hollar, Prague 1997, ISBN 80-902405-0-X.

Encyclopaedias, dictionaries 
 Dictionary of Czech writers : an attempt to reconstruct the history of Czech literature 1948-1979. Jiří Brabec (ed.) et al., Sixty-Eight Publishers, Toronto 1982, ISBN 0-88781-128-0
 Dictionary of banned authors 1948-1980. Jiří Brabec, Jan Lopatka, Jiří Gruša, Petr Kabeš, Igor Hájek; index compiled by Aleš Zach,  349 p., Státní pedagogické nakladatelství, Prague 1991, ISBN 80-04-25417-9
 SČUG Hollar 1917-1992 : contemporary graphics. František Dvořák et al., 128 p., Union of Czech Artists and Graphic Designers Hollar, Prague 1992, Text in English and German. Variant titles SČUG Hollar / SČUG Hollar 1917-1992 : contemporary graphic art / SČUG Hollar 1917-1992 : zeitgenössische Graphik.
 Graphics : Pictorial Encyclopaedia of Czech Graphic Art of the Eighties, 255 p., Concept and introductory text by Simeona Hošková, Central European Gallery and Publishing House, Prague 1993 (Concurrent text and subtitle in English, French, Italian, German, Spanish), ISBN 80-901559-0-1
 New encyclopedia of Czech visual arts. N-F. Ed. Anděla Horová (ed.), 623 p., Academia, Prague 1995, ISBN 80-200-0536-6
 Dictionary of Czech and Slovak Visual Artists 1950-2003. XI. Pau-Pop. Alena Malá (ed.), 252 p., Chagall Art Centre, Ostrava 2003, ISBN 80-86171-16-7

External links 
 website Naděžda Plíšková
 Naděžda Plíšková in the abART information system
 Naděžda Plíšková in Dictionary of Czech Literature after 1945
 Cabinet of Czech Graphic Art: Naděžda Plíšková
 Grapheion.cz: Naděžda Plíšková
 Ex Libris: Naděžda Plíšková

1934 births
1999 deaths
Czech women sculptors
Czech printmakers
Women printmakers
Czech women poets
20th-century Czech poets
20th-century Czech women writers
20th-century Czech sculptors
20th-century printmakers
People from Kladno
Academy of Fine Arts, Prague alumni
Hochschule für Grafik und Buchkunst Leipzig alumni
Czech women painters